Lady Dufferin Hospital is district general hospital is located in Karachi, Sindh. Lady Dufferin Hospital to since on 1898, was named after the British peeress Lady Dufferin. Benazir Bhutto, the former Prime Minister of Pakistan, gave birth to a son Bilawal Bhutto Zardari in the hospital in 1988.

Donations
Seth Edulji Dinshaw contributed a sum of Rs. 50,000/- for its establishment in 1898, which may be equal to $1 million-$2 million today.

Foundation laying ceremony
The foundation laying ceremony was performed on 12 November 1894 by Lady Elgin.

In 1915, Dr. Elizabeth Stephens Imprey was appointed the new head of the hospital, but she never made it to Karachi from England. She boarded the P & O liner SS Persia as a first-class passenger in Tilbury, London. The ship was sunk off Crete's coast by a German submarine on December 30, 1915. More than 340 passengers drowned, including Dr. Imprey.

Features
Initially, a ward in this hospital was kept specifically for Parsis. In January 1917, the Virbaijee Maternity Wing was opened.

History
At the end of the 19th century, the women of India were prepared to die rather than receive treatment in general hospitals in the presence of male patients. When Queen Victoria was informed of the plight of these women, she asked Lady Hariot Dufferin, the wife of the Viceroy of India at that time, to help find a solution. Lady Hariot Dufferin decided to establish hospitals exclusively for women and children. These Dufferin Hospitals were located in Karachi, Quetta, Shikarpur & Hyderabad (now in Pakistan) and Delhi, Nagpor and Calcutta (in independent India) as well as one in the Burmese capital Rangoon.
 
She appealed to the local philanthropists to donate to the “Dufferin Fund” in order to build these hospitals. In response to this appeal Mr. Eduljee Dinshaw, a renowned philanthropist, established the Lady Dufferin Hospital, Karachi, by a princely donation, in 1894 as a Charitable Institute. The foundation laying ceremony of Eduljee Dinshaw Wing was performed on 12 November 1894 by Lady Elgin with Kincardine and completed in 1898.

Katrak Maternity Wing:
The Foundation Stone was laid in August 1914 and the building was completed in June 1915.  The Opening ceremony took place on 6 January 1916. Total Cost: Rs. 70,000/-

Engineer in Charge:    S.G. Lyttle, P.W.D
Physician in Charge:   MVS. Leonard (Gumprich, M.B. ch B)
Architect:             Durcdas B. Advani
Contractor:            Sewji Ganesh
Honorary:              F.S. Punnett
Secretaries:           E. A. Pearson Katrak Maternity Wing (As stand today)

Renovation works commenced on 27 February 1999. The Ground breaking ceremony was performed by Moinuddin Haider, former Governor of Sindh. The work was completed in December 2005.

In 1915, Dr. Elizabeth Stephens Imprey was appointed the new head of the hospital, but she never made it to Karachi from England. She boarded the P & O liner SS Persia as a first-class passenger in Tilbury, London. The ship was sunk off Crete coast by a German submarine on December 30, 1915. More than 340 passengers drowned, including Dr. Imprey.

Current status
Today, the Lady Dufferin Hospital has a capacity of 300 beds with 4 operation theatres, prenatal and postnatal wards, ultrasound department, neo-natal intensive care unit, labor room, consulting rooms, private and semi-private rooms, outpatient department (OPD), family planning services and 24-hour laboratory, radiology and pharmacy. The hospital is one of the largest reputable maternity hospitals in Pakistan. It has state-of-the-art equipment enabling it to provide comprehensive obstetric, gynecological, and neonatal healthcare. 

This includes deliveries, advanced hysteroscopy / laparoscopic surgery, cancer surgery, and infertility (including IVF as a satellite unit). The Neo-natal Intensive Care Unit at the Lady Dufferin Hospital provides critical care at highly subsidized rates. We have recently added another new high-tech ventilator and a bubble CPAP unit, and provide free ventilator support for neonates.

COWASJEE School of Midwifery
The school is a continuation of the Phyllis Louise Lawrence Institute, which was established in 1912 with the generous donation of Nadirshaw Eduljee Dinshaw, the son of Eduljee Dinshaw, the original benefactor of the Lady Dufferin.

The distinguishing feature of the Lady Dufferin is the quality of care provided to the patients irrespective of their financial status.
 
Nursing Training:
In the beginning, the hospital was started for women and children. In order to fulfill its needs for Nursing Services, the School of Nursing for General and Midwifery was started in 1912. General Nursing was discontinued in 1964 and the entire focus was shifted to midwifery training.

It was among the first midwifery schools recognized by the Central Board of Midwives of the U.K. Since 1994, the School of midwifery has maintained approx. 98% success rate in the qualifying Examination Board (SNEB). In 1994 a student obtained the First Position with honors in the whole province of Sindh as well as all across Pakistan.
 
During the training period, the students are provided free accommodation, food, and health coverage. After the completion of training, it is mandatory to give one year of service to the hospital.

Since its inception, the school was shifted from one building to another within the premises of the hospital. In view of this, the hospital administration decided to build a School of Midwifery including hostel facilities.

Ardeshir Cowasjee who created Cowasjee Foundation, built a proper school of Midwifery including the hostel which was completed in 2011. The opening ceremony of the school was held on 25 February 2012.

Future plans
Isardas Asonmal Dispensary Building
This stone structure was built in 1911 and renovated with the help of the Sindh Flood Relief Fund at a cost RS 7,000 in 1933. It housed the Out-Patient and Ultrasound Departments for decades until 2009 when the OPD was shifted due to space constraints and the dilapidated state of the building.

The hospital currently needs an out-patient facility where all related services can be provided in the same building thereby minimizing inconvenience to patients and enhancing the efficiency of treatment. These services, i.e. Obstetric and Gynaecological, Pediatric and Diabetic clinics, Ultrasound Department, Laboratory, Radiology, Pharmacy, and Vaccination units are spread out over the hospital premises and need to be integrated.  We are also planning to incorporate a proper purpose-built waiting area for patients’ attendants and visitors. 

We envisage this state-of-the-art building to help create a friendly, welcoming, and minimally stressful experience for our patients and their families while also facilitating an efficient and disciplined environment for patient care.

References

Hospitals in Karachi
Hospital buildings completed in 1898
Hospitals established in 1898
1898 establishments in British India